Joseph Turner (March 28, 1919 – December 13, 1944 or January 21, 1945) was a Canadian professional ice hockey goaltender who played one game in the National Hockey League with the Detroit Red Wings during the 1941–42 season. He later served in the United States Army during the Second World War, and was killed in action during the Battle of Hürtgen Forest in 1945.

Biography

Turner was born in Windsor, Ontario. He played with the Guelph Indians of the Ontario Hockey Association and led the league in goals allowed on three occasions.  Detroit, which held his rights, sent him to their American Hockey League affiliate, the Indianapolis Capitals, in 1941. There he played in the first AHL All-Star Game and was a first team All-Star as goaltender. He would also lead the Capitals to a Calder Cup championship. On February 5, 1942, he replaced an injured Johnny Mowers in a 3–3 tie against the Toronto Maple Leafs for his only appearance in the NHL.

After the season, he signed up for the United States Army as a 2nd Lieutenant in Company K, 311th Infantry, 78th Division and fought in World War II. He was originally classified as Missing in Action in the Hurtgen Forest, Germany on December 13, 1944. For his service, the International Hockey League named its championship trophy, the Turner Cup, after him.

Career statistics

Regular season and playoffs

See also
 List of players who played only one game in the NHL

References

External links
 
Columbia Chronicle article on Turner
Legends of Hockey article on Turner Cup

1919 births
1940s deaths
Year of death uncertain
Canadian emigrants to the United States
Canadian ice hockey goaltenders
Detroit Red Wings players
Ice hockey people from Ontario
Indianapolis Capitals players
Missing in action of World War II
Ontario Hockey Association Senior A League (1890–1979) players
Sportspeople from Windsor, Ontario
United States Army officers
United States Army personnel killed in World War II